Presidential elections were held in the Granadine Confederation in 1860, the first under the 1858 constitution. The elections were held during the 1860–62 civil war, but not in the parts of the country controlled by the Liberal Party, and the Liberal Party did not put forward a candidate in the remainder of the country. As a result, the election was a contest between two Conservative Party candidates, Pedro Alcántara Herrán and Julio Arboleda Pombo, with Julio Arboleda Pombo emerging as the winner with 73% of votes.

Results

References

Colombia
1860 in the Granadine Confederation
Presidential elections in Colombia